Sweden was represented by 41 athletes at the 2010 European Athletics Championships held in  Barcelona, Spain, from 27 July to 1 August 2010.

Participants

Results

Men
Track and road events

Field events

Women
Track and road events

Field events

References 
Participants list

Nations at the 2010 European Athletics Championships
Sweden at the European Athletics Championships
European Athletics Championships